There have been two races named Coors 200:

Coors 200 (USAC): a USAC National Championship Citicorp Cup Champ Car race held at Texas World Speedway in 1978
Coors 200 (South Boston), a NASCAR Busch Series race held at South Boston Speedway from 1986 to 1990